Sarah Fielding (8 November 1710 – 9 April 1768) was an English author and sister of the novelist Henry Fielding. She wrote The Governess, or The Little Female Academy (1749), thought to be the first novel in English aimed expressly at children. Earlier she had success with her novel The Adventures of David Simple (1744).

Childhood
Sarah Fielding was born at East Stour, Dorset in 1710 to Edmund Feilding [sic] and his wife Sarah, née Gould (died 1718), after Henry and Ursula; her younger siblings were Anne, Beatrice, and Edmund. Sarah's father, Edmund, the third son of John Feilding, was a military officer and relative of the Earls of Denbigh (his father, John, had been the youngest son of the 3rd Earl). Although Edmund spelled his last name "Feilding" as often as "Fielding," both Henry and Sarah spelled the name "Fielding." When asked by an Earl of Denbigh why, Henry Fielding's son said, "I cannot tell, my Lord, except it be that my branch of the family were the first that knew how to spell". Sarah Fielding's mother, Sarah Gould, was the daughter of Sir Henry Gould, a judge on the King's Bench who had been reappointed to the Queen's Bench. This descent is important for understanding the early life and education of Edmund Feilding's children.

Edmund left the care of his children to his wife's mother, Lady Sarah Gould, while he built his career in London. The children grew up in her home in Glastonbury and their paternal grandfather's house in East Stour (John Feilding being a latitudinarian Cambridge-educated parish priest with three livings, who had been considered for a bishopric in Ireland. Henry was sent to Eton, but all of the daughters were sent to Mary Rookes's boarding school in Salisbury. This was "non-academic, but she was later extremely well read in Greek, Latin, French and English."

When Edmund's first wife (Fielding's mother) died in 1718, Edmund married Anne Rapha, a Roman Catholic widow, who brought with her several children, and later bore Edmund a son and half-brother for Henry and Sarah, the future reformer John Fielding. Sir Henry and Lady Sarah Gould (Fielding's maternal grandparents) had fallen out with Edmund before the death of the children's mother. Lady Gould was highly displeased with Edmund's second marriage, and Anne Fielding (née Rapha) was the subject of much anti-Catholic sentiment from the elder generation of the family. Lady Gould was so set against Anne and her enlargement to the family that, in 1721, she sued for custody of the children and ownership of the family house in East Stour. She eventually won, leaving the children unable to see their father for some years.

Writing career

In the 1740s, Fielding moved to London, sometimes living with her sisters and sometimes with her brother Henry and his family. The women of the family lacked sufficient money for a dowry, and consequently none married. Even when Lady Gould died in 1733, there was little money for the children.

Fielding turned to writing to make a living, beginning while she lived with her brother and acted as his housekeeper. In 1742, Henry Fielding published Joseph Andrews, and Sarah Fielding is often credited with having written the letter from Leonora to Horatio (two of the characters in the book). In 1743, Henry Fielding published his Miscellanies (containing his life of Jonathan Wild), and his sister may have written its narrative of the life of Anne Boleyn.

In 1744, Fielding published a novel, The Adventures of David Simple in Search of a Faithful Friend. As was the habit, it was published anonymously, while pleading financial distress. The novel was quite successful and gathered praise from contemporaries, including the publisher and novelist Samuel Richardson. As a "moral romance", it features two disinherited couples. Both heroines point to "the stifling of women's intellect and the barriers against a gentlewoman's earning her living." It was followed by the Familiar Letters (1747) of the two couples and by a Volume the Last added to a later edition (1753). Richardson, who was himself the target of Henry Fielding's satire, said that he thought Sarah and Henry were possessed of equal gifts of writing. The Adventures of David Simple went into a second edition within ten weeks, and was translated into French and German. The title pages to Sarah Fielding's other novels often carried the advertisement that they were written by "the author of David Simple". The novel was sufficiently popular that Fielding wrote Familiar Letters between the Principal Characters in David Simple as an epistolary furtherance to the novel in 1747. In 1753, she wrote a sequel to The Adventures of David Simple entitled David Simple: Volume the Last.

David Simple was one of the earliest sentimental novels, featuring a wayfaring hero in search of true friendship who triumphs by good nature and moral strength. He finds happiness in marriage and a rural, bucolic life, away from the corruptions of the city. Simple is an analogue, in a sense, of the figure of Heartsfree, in Henry Fielding's Jonathan Wild and Squire Allworthy in his Tom Jones. However, he also shares features with other sentimental figures who find peace only with escape from corruption and the harmony of a new Utopia. In her Volume the Last, however, Fielding's fiction, like Henry Fielding's, is darker and shows less faith in the triumph of goodness in the face of a corrosive, immoral world.

Sarah Fielding wrote three other novels with original stories. The most significant of these was The Governess, or The Little Female Academy (1749), which is the first novel in English written especially for children. In addition, she wrote The History of the Countess of Dellwyn (1759) and The History of Ophelia (1760).

As a critic, Sarah Fielding's Remarks on Clarissa (1749) concern the novel Clarissa by Samuel Richardson. As a biographer, she wrote The Lives of Cleopatra and Octavia (1757), a history, written from Greek and Roman sources, on the lives of Cleopatra and Octavia, two famous women of Roman times. As a translator she produced Xenophon's Memoirs of Socrates, with the Defense of Socrates Before His Judges (1762), a work by the Ancient Greek writer and soldier Xenophon concerning the philosopher.

Final years
Fielding's sisters died between 1750 and 1751 and Henry in 1754. Fielding retired from London and moved to a small house just outside Bath. The famous philanthropist Ralph Allen and the similarly famous Elizabeth Montagu (a member of the Blue Stockings Society) gave her some financial aid. In about 1767, the novelist Sarah Scott, sister of Elizabeth Montagu, invited Fielding to come and live with her in a female utopian community, as an attempt to create the utopia described in Millenium Hall, but Fielding declined. She died in 1768. There is a memorial plaque to her on the west porch of Bath Abbey.

List of works
1744 – The Adventures of David Simple >> A download link 
1747 – Familiar Letters between the Principal Characters in David Simple
1749 – The Governess, or The Little Female Academy >> A download link for a rewritten work 
1749 – Remarks on "Clarissa"
1753 – David Simple: Volume the Last
1754 – The Cry: A New Dramatic Fable (with Jane Collier)
1757 – The Lives of Cleopatra and Octavia >> A download link 
1759 – The History of the Countess of Dellwyn
1761 – The History of Ophelia  >> Download links for volume 1  and Volume 2 
1762 – Xenophon's Memoirs of Socrates, with the Defense of Socrates Before His Judges >> A download link

Notes

References
Chawton House Women's Writing Entry
Martin C. Battestin and Ruthe R. Battestin: Henry Fielding: A Life. New York: Routledge, 1989

Further reading
Barchas, Janine. "Sarah Fielding's Dashing Style and Eighteenth-Century Print Culture". ELH 63.3 (1996): 633–56.
Battestin, Martin C. and Clive T. Probyn, eds. The Correspondence of Henry and Sarah Fielding. Oxford: Oxford University Press, 1993.
Battestin, Martin C. "Henry Fielding, Sarah Fielding, and 'the Dreadful Sin of Incest'". Novel 13.1 (1979): 6–18.
Bree, Linda. Sarah Fielding. New York: Twayne Publishers, 1996.
Downs-Miers, Deborah. "Spring the Trap: Subtexts and Subversions". Fetter'd or Free?: British Women Novelists, 1670–1815. Eds. Mary Anne Schofield and Cecilia Macheski. Athens: Ohio University Press, 1986.
Eaves, T. C. Duncan and Ben D. Kimpel. Samuel Richardson: A Biography. Oxford: Oxford University Press, 1971.
Fielding, Sarah. The History of Ophelia. Ed. Peter Sabor. Peterborough, ON: Broadview Press, 2004. .
Johnson, Christopher D. "Introduction". The Lives of Cleopatra and Octavia. London: Associated University Presses, 1994.
Needham, Arnold E. The Life and Works of Sarah Fielding. 1943.
Nussbaum, Felicity A. The Limits of the Human: Fictions of Anomaly, Race, and Gender in the Long Eighteenth Century. Cambridge: Cambridge University Press, 2003.
Rizzo, Betty. Companions Without Vows: Relationships Among Eighteenth-Century British Women. Athens: University of Georgia Press, 1994.
Sabor, Peter. "Richardson, Henry Fielding, and Sarah Fielding". The Cambridge Companion to English Literature 1740-1830. Eds. Thomas Keymer and Jon Mee. Cambridge: Cambridge University Press, 2004.
Schellenberg, Betty A. The Professionalization of Women Writers in Eighteenth-Century Britain. Cambridge: Cambridge University Press, 2005.
Schofield, Mary Anne. Masking and Unmasking the Female Mind. University of Delaware Press, 1990.
Skinner, Gillian. "'The Price of a Tear': Economic Sense and Sensibility in Sarah Fielding's David Simple". Literature and History 3rd series. 1.1 (1992): 16–28.
Spencer, Jane. The Rise of the Woman Novelist: From Aphra Behn to Jane Austen. Oxford: Basil Blackwell, 1986.
Spender, Dale. Mothers of the Novel. London: Pandora, 1986.
Stern, Simon. "Speech and Property in David Simple." ELH 79.3 (2012): 623–54.
Stockstill, Ashley. "Better Homes and Gardens: The Fairy World(s) of Sarah Fielding and Sarah Scott". Feminist Studies in English Literature 6.2 (1998): 137–58.
Terry, Richard. "David Simple and the Fallacy of Friendship". SEL: Studies in English Literature 1500–1900. 44.3 (2004): 525–44.
Todd, Janet. The Sign of Angellica: Women, Writing and Fiction, 1660–1800. New York: Columbia University Press, 1989.
Woodward, Carolyn. "Sarah Fielding's Self-Destructing Utopia: The Adventures of David Simple". Living by the Pen: Early British Women Writers. Ed. Dale Spender. New York: Teachers College Press, 1992.

External links

 
 
 
 

1710 births
1768 deaths
18th-century English novelists
18th-century English women writers
18th-century English writers
English children's writers
English women novelists
British women children's writers
People from North Dorset District
Writers from London
Sarah